The 1937–38 season was the 53rd season in Liverpool F.C.'s existence, and the club ended the season in 11th place. Liverpool reached the fifth round of the FA Cup but was knocked out by Huddersfield Town.

Goalkeepers
 Arthur Riley
 Dirk Kemp
 Alf Hobson

Defenders
 Ernie Blenkinsop
 Tom Bradshaw
 John Browning
 Matt Busby
 Jimmy McInnes
 Tom Cooper
 Jim Harley
 Fred Rogers
 Bernard Ramsden
 Ron Jones
 Jimmy McDougall
 Ben Dabbs
 Ted Savage
 William Hood
 John Easdale
 Tom Bush

Midfielders
 Berry Nieuwenhuys
 Harman van den Berg
 Harry Eastham
 Alf Hanson

Strikers
 Jack Balmer
 Phil Taylor
 Willie Fagan
 John Shafto
 Fred Howe
 Alexander Smith
 Ted Harston

Table

References
 LFC History.net – 1937–1938 season
 Liverweb - 1937–38 Season

1937-38
Liverpool